Kungsgatan (Swedish: "The King's Street") is a common name for major streets in Swedish cities, the three most well-known being:

Kungsgatan, Stockholm
Kungsgatan, Gothenburg
Kungsgatan, Malmö

See also
 Kungsgatan metro station, an early name for the station now known as Hötorget in Stockholm, Sweden
 Kungsgatan (film), a 1943 Swedish film